"In the Arms of Love" is a song featured in the 1966 film, What Did You Do in the War, Daddy? The song's music was composed by Henry Mancini with lyrics by Jay Livingston and Ray Evans and was performed by Andy Williams. "In the Arms of Love" peaked at #49 on the Billboard Hot 100 and was Williams' second of four number ones on the Easy Listening chart, where it stayed at the top for two weeks in October 1966. The song also reached #33 in the UK.

See also
List of number-one adult contemporary singles of 1966 (U.S.)

References

1966 singles
Songs with music by Henry Mancini
Songs with music by Jay Livingston
Songs with lyrics by Ray Evans
Andy Williams songs
Columbia Records singles
Songs written for films
1966 songs